Sonali Sachdev (née Mahimtura) is an Indian actress. She is well known for portraying gynecologist Dr. Shilpa Thakkar in the super-hit Star Plus TV series Baa Bahoo Aur Baby. She has worked in multiple Indian TV shows and Bollywood films. She has been recently seen in Indian Hindi-language medical drama streaming television series on Amazon Prime Video  web series Mumbai Diaries 26/11 as Shamita Parekh.

Early life
Sonali is of Gujarati descent through her father's side. She is a qualified dentist who later decided to pursue her dream of becoming an actress.

Filmography

Films 
 2018 - Kedarnath as Mukku's Mother
 2014 – Pizza
 2007 – Taare Zameen Par as Irene (School teacher)
 2012 – Mere Dost Picture Abhi Baki Hai
 2013 – Labours Of (An)Other Solipsist as Alice
 2012 – Rizwan (Short) as Ammi
 2010 – Aashayein as Doctor 
 2009 – Aamras: The Sweet Taste of Friendship as Mrs. Sehgal (as Sonali)
 2009 – Wishes (2009 film)
 2021 – Mumbai Diaries 26/11 as Shamitha Parekh

Television

References

External links 
 
 

Year of birth missing (living people)
21st-century Indian actresses
Actresses in Hindi cinema
Indian film actresses
Indian television actresses
Indian soap opera actresses
Living people
Actresses from Mumbai
Gujarati people
Actresses in Hindi television